Elaine Davidson is a Brazilian-Scottish former nurse, based in Edinburgh who Guinness World Records has certified as the "Most Pierced Woman".

When examined by a Guinness World Record official in May 2000, Davidson had 462 piercings, with 192 in her face alone. By 9 August 2001 when she was re-examined she was found to have 720 piercings. Performing at the Edinburgh Festival in 2005, The Guardian reported that she now had 3,950 body piercings. As of 2003, she had more piercings in her genitalia than in any other part of the body – 500 in all, externally and internally. The total weight of her internal piercings is estimated to be about 3 kilograms. As of February 2009 her piercings totaled 6,005. In a 2023 interview on ITV's This Morning with Dermot O'Leary and Alison Hammond, Elaine shared her goal to one day reach 20,000 piercings in total.

See also
Body modification

References

External links

 Elaine Davidson - Guinness World Record Holder
 Elaine Davidson on Govan Folk

Body piercing
Brazilian nurses
Brazilian emigrants to Scotland
Living people
Year of birth missing (living people)
20th-century births
Women nurses